John Fogarty, C.S.Sp. (born 9 April 1952) is an Irish Catholic priest who served as the 24th Superior General of the Congregation of the Holy Spirit, commonly known as the Spiritans.

Biography
Fogarty was born 9 April 1952 in Finglas, Dublin, and educated at St Vincent's CBS, Glasnevin. He earned a Bachelor of Science Degree (Physics and Mathematical Physics) at the University College Dublin in 1976. After graduation, he entered the Spiritans and professed his final religious vows on 2 October 1979. He was ordained a priest on 27 September 1981.

After his ordination, Fogarty studied at the University of Fribourg in Switzerland, where he obtained a Licentiate in Sacred Theology in 1982. Following this, he served in a parish of the Diocese of Kumasi in Ghana until 1986. For three years after that first assignment, he was on the Provincial Council in Dublin. He served as Rector of the Spiritan Institute of Philosophy in Ejisu, Ghana from 1990 to 1994. In 1994, Fogarty returned to Ireland, serving as Assistant Provincial Superior until 1998, whereupon he served as First Assistant to the Superior General in Rome until 2004. In 2005, he was appointed Director of the Spiritan Center at Duquesne University, Pittsburgh, Pennsylvania, U.S.

In June 2009, he was elected provincial of the American Province of the congregation. He had been re-elected for a second term shortly before his election as Superior General at the General Chapter of the congregation assembled at Bagamoyo, Tanzania.

References

1952 births
People from Finglas
People educated at St. Vincent's C.B.S., Glasnevin
Alumni of the National University of Ireland
Alumni of University College Dublin
Holy Ghost Fathers
Irish Spiritans
20th-century Irish Roman Catholic priests
21st-century American Roman Catholic priests
University of Fribourg alumni
Irish Roman Catholic missionaries
Living people
Roman Catholic missionaries in Ghana
Irish expatriates in Ghana
Irish expatriates in the United States
Duquesne University faculty
Roman Catholic missionaries in the United States
Roman Catholic missionaries in Tanzania
Irish expatriates in Tanzania